Ralf Vollmer (born 5 July 1962) is a retired German football midfielder.

References

1962 births
Living people
German footballers
Stuttgarter Kickers players
Association football midfielders
Bundesliga players
2. Bundesliga players

Stuttgarter Kickers managers